Lahore features a five-season semi-arid climate (Köppen climate classification BSh) with five seasons: foggy winter (30
Nov – 15 Feb) with few western disturbances causing rain; pleasant spring (16 Feb – 15 April); summer (15 April – 30 June) with dust, rain storms and heat wave periods; rainy monsoon (1 July – 16 September); and dry autumn (16 September –14 November).

The hottest month is June, where average highs routinely exceed . The wettest month is July, with heavy rainfalls and evening thunderstorms with the possibility of cloudbursts. The coolest month is January with dense fog.

Factors
Monsoons and western disturbances are the two main factors that affect the weather in Lahore; otherwise, continental air prevails for rest of the seasons. Following are the main factors that influence the weather of Lahore.
Western disturbances generally occur during the winter months and cause moderate rainfall; rarely, hailstorms also occur.
Fog is dense during the winter season and remains for days to weeks.
Dust storms occur during summer months, peaking in May and June.
Heat waves are intense in May and June.
Southwest monsoons also occur in the summer, from June until September. These heavy monsoon rains bring relief from scorching heat.
Continental air prevails during the period when there is no precipitation in the city.

Monsoon rainfall

Monsoon rains commence from the last week of June and persist until the end of September. In 2009, Lahore saw below-normal monsoon rainfalls due to the presence of El-Nino over Pakistan. Following are monsoon rainfall precipitation data for Lahore since 2007, taken from the Pakistan Meteorological Department:
 2003: 
 2005: 
 2006: 
 2007: 
 2008: 
 2009: 
 2010: 
 2011: 
 2012: 
 2013:

Annual rainfall
Lahore mainly receives its rainfall during the monsoon season from June till September, and in winter season from December till February. The highest-ever annual rainfall in Lahore was recorded in 2011 when  of rainfall was recorded. Lahore received below normal rains in 2009, and normal rains in 2007 and 2010. The following is the Annual rainfall in Lahore since 2007 based on data from the Pakistan Meteorological Department.

 In 2007, a total of  rain was recorded.
 In 2008, a total of  rain was recorded.
 In 2009, a total of  rain was recorded.
 In 2010, a total of  rain was recorded.
 In 2011, a total of  rain was recorded as of 21 September 2011.

Extreme weather events
On 26 February 2011, Lahore received an isolated but strong hailstorm measuring 4.5 cm that carpeted several roads of the city. The hailstorm was the heaviest in Lahore for the last 30 years. Usually, hailstorms occur in the plain areas of the Punjab province during the winter season. The hailstorm lasted for 30 minutes intermittently with heavy rain showers.

See also
 Climate of Pakistan
 List of extreme weather records in Pakistan

References

External links
 Pakistan Meteorology Department
 Climate Data Of Lahore

Lahore
Lahore